Hexagrammos is a genus of marine ray-finned fishes belonging to the family Hexagrammidae, the greenlings. These fishes are found in the north Pacific Ocean.

Taxonomy
Hexagrammos was first proposed as a monospecific genus in 1810 by the German naturalist Tilesius when he described Hexagrammos asper giving its type locality as Petropavlovsk in Kamchatka. Tilesius's original name was subsequently incorrectly changed to H. stelleri and this was the name which became settled on in the literature that followed and this use and practice means it  that it is impractical to bring H. asper into common use. The genus is the only genus in the monogeneric subfamily Hexagramminae, within the family Hexagrammidae, part of the suborder Cottoidei within the order Scorpaeniformes.

Etymology
Hexagrammos is a combination of hexa, meaning "six", and grammos, meaning " line", a reference to the multiple lateral line canals with the fifth, lowest canal being divided to produce six such canals.

Species
The currently recognized species in this genus are:

References

 
Hexagrammidae
Ray-finned fish genera